Sphaerodactylus is a genus of geckos from the Americas that are distinguished from other Gekkota by their small size, by their round, rather than vertical, eye pupils, and by each digit terminating in a single, round adhesive pad or scale, from which their name (Sphaero = round, dactylus = finger) is derived. All species in this genus are rather small, but two species, S. ariasae and S. parthenopion, are tiny, and – with a snout-vent length of about  – the smallest reptiles in the world.

Fossil record
Fossil remains referred to Sphaerodactylus have been recovered from Dominican amber.

Species
The following 108 species are recognized as being valid.

Sphaerodactylus alphus  - Guanaja large-scaled geckolet 
Sphaerodactylus altavelensis  - Alto Velo least gecko, Alto Velo sphaero
Sphaerodactylus argivus  - Cayman least gecko
Sphaerodactylus argus  - ocellated gecko, ocellated sphaero, stippled sphaero
Sphaerodactylus ariasae  - Jaragua sphaero, Jaragua dwarf gecko
Sphaerodactylus armasi  -  Guantanamo least gecko, Guantanamo coastal gecko
Sphaerodactylus armstrongi  - Armstrong's least gecko, southern forest geckolet 
Sphaerodactylus asterulus  - Haitian least gecko
Sphaerodactylus beattyi  - Saint Croix's sphaero, Beatty's least gecko
Sphaerodactylus becki  - Beck's least gecko
Sphaerodactylus bromeliarum  - El Yunque least gecko
Sphaerodactylus caicosensis  - Caicos banded sphaero, Caicos least gecko
Sphaerodactylus callocricus  - rough-banded sphaero, callous least gecko
Sphaerodactylus celicara  - Baracoan eyespot sphaero
Sphaerodactylus cinereus  - gray gecko
Sphaerodactylus clenchi  - peninsula least gecko
Sphaerodactylus cochranae  - Cochran's least gecko
Sphaerodactylus continentalis  - upper Central American geckolet 
Sphaerodactylus copei  - Cope's least gecko
Sphaerodactylus corticola  - central Bahamas sphaero, Rum Cay least gecko
Sphaerodactylus cricoderus  - Turquino collared sphaero
Sphaerodactylus cryphius  - Bakoruco least gecko
Sphaerodactylus dacnicolor  - Jamaican tailspot sphaero, eastern Jamaican sharpnosed sphaero
Sphaerodactylus darlingtoni  - Darlington's least gecko
Sphaerodactylus difficilis  - Hispaniolan eyespot sphaero, difficult least gecko
Sphaerodactylus dimorphicus  - Santiago de Cuba geckolet 
Sphaerodactylus docimus  - Cabo Cruz banded sphaero
Sphaerodactylus dunni  - Dunn's least gecko
Sphaerodactylus elasmorhynchus  - Marche Leon least gecko, snout-shield sphaero 
Sphaerodactylus elegans  - ashy gecko 
Sphaerodactylus elegantulus  - Antigua least gecko
Sphaerodactylus epiurus  - Hispaniolan tailspot sphaero
Sphaerodactylus exsul  - Swan Islands geckolet 
Sphaerodactylus fantasticus  - fantastic least gecko
Sphaerodactylus gaigeae  -chevronated sphaero, Gaige's least gecko 
Sphaerodactylus gilvitorques  - Jamaican collared sphaero, Jamaican least gecko
Sphaerodactylus glaucus  - collared dwarf gecko, least gecko
Sphaerodactylus goniorhynchus  - Jamaican forest sphaero, Cakoarita least gecko
Sphaerodactylus grandisquamis  - big-scaled least gecko, big-scaled dwarf gecko, cotton ginner
Sphaerodactylus graptolaemus  - Costa Rica least gecko
Sphaerodactylus guanajae  - Guanaja head-spotted geckolet 
Sphaerodactylus heliconiae 
Sphaerodactylus homolepis  - Caribbean least gecko
Sphaerodactylus inaguae  - Inagua sphaero, Inagua least gecko
Sphaerodactylus inigoi  - Isla Vieques dwarf gecko 
Sphaerodactylus intermedius  - Mantanzas least gecko
Sphaerodactylus kirbyi  - Bequia dwarf gecko, Bequia sphaero, Grenadines sphaero
Sphaerodactylus klauberi  - Klauber's dwarf gecko, Klauber's least gecko, Puerto Rican highland sphaero
Sphaerodactylus ladae  - Martin Garcia least gecko
Sphaerodactylus lazelli  - Cap-Haitien least gecko
Sphaerodactylus leonardovaldesi 
Sphaerodactylus leucaster  - eastern least gecko
Sphaerodactylus levinsi  - Desecheo gecko, Isla Desecheo least gecko
Sphaerodactylus lineolatus  - Panama least gecko
Sphaerodactylus macrolepis  - big-scaled least gecko, big-scaled dwarf gecko, cotton ginner
Sphaerodactylus mariguanae  - southern Bahamas sphaero, Mayaguana least gecko
Sphaerodactylus microlepis  - little-scaled least gecko 
Sphaerodactylus micropithecus  - Monito gecko
Sphaerodactylus millepunctatus  - spotted least gecko
Sphaerodactylus molei  - Tobago least gecko  
Sphaerodactylus monensis  - Mona least gecko
Sphaerodactylus nicholsi  - Nichols least gecko, Nichol's dwarf sphaero, Puerto Rican crescent sphaero
Sphaerodactylus nigropunctatus  - black-spotted least gecko, three-banded sphaero
Sphaerodactylus notatus  - reef gecko, brown-speckled sphaero
Sphaerodactylus nycteropus  - Morne Dubois least gecko
Sphaerodactylus ocoae  - Peravia least gecko
Sphaerodactylus oliveri  - Juventud least gecko
Sphaerodactylus omoglaux  - Fond Parisien least gecko
Sphaerodactylus oxyrhinus  - Jamaican sharpnosed sphaero
Sphaerodactylus pacificus  - Pacific least gecko
Sphaerodactylus parkeri  - Parker's least gecko, southern Jamaica banded sphaero
Sphaerodactylus parthenopion  - Virgin Islands dwarf sphaero, Virgin Gorda least gecko, Virgin Islands dwarf gecko
Sphaerodactylus parvus  - Anguilla Bank geckolet
Sphaerodactylus perissodactylius   - Dominican least gecko
Sphaerodactylus phyzacinus  - Les Saintes geckolet 
Sphaerodactylus pimienta  -  pepper sphaero, Cuban pepper sphaero
Sphaerodactylus plummeri  - Barahona big-scaled sphaero
Sphaerodactylus poindexteri  - Utila small-scaled geckolet 
Sphaerodactylus ramsdeni  - Ramsden's least gecko
Sphaerodactylus randi  - Pedernales least gecko
Sphaerodactylus rhabdotus  - two-striped sphaero, Vallede Neiba least gecko
Sphaerodactylus richardi  - Richard's banded sphaero, Zapata big-scaled sphaero
Sphaerodactylus richardsonii  - Richardson's least gecko, northern Jamaica banded sphaero
Sphaerodactylus roosevelti  - Roosevelt's beige sphaero, Roosevelt's least gecko
Sphaerodactylus rosaurae  - Bay Island least gecko
Sphaerodactylus ruibali  - Ruibal's least gecko
Sphaerodactylus sabanus  - Saba least gecko
Sphaerodactylus samanensis  - Samana least gecko
Sphaerodactylus savagei  - Altagracia speckled sphaero, Savage's least gecko
Sphaerodactylus scaber  - double-collared sphaero, Camaguey least gecko
Sphaerodactylus scapularis  - Boulenger's least gecko
Sphaerodactylus schuberti  - Neiba agave geckolet, Neiba agave sphaero, Schubert's least gecko
Sphaerodactylus schwartzi  - Guantanamo collared sphaero, Monitongas collared geckolet, Schwartz's dwarf gecko
Sphaerodactylus semasiops  - Cockpit eyespot sphaero, Cockpit least gecko
Sphaerodactylus shrevei  - Shreve's least gecko
Sphaerodactylus siboney  - Siboney gray-headed geckolet 
Sphaerodactylus sommeri  - TerreNueve least gecko, Terre-Neuve least gecko, northwest Haitian banded geckolet
Sphaerodactylus sputator  - island least gecko
Sphaerodactylus storeyae  - Isle of Pines sphaero, Los Canarreos sphaero
Sphaerodactylus streptophorus  - Hispaniola least gecko, Hispaniolan small-eared sphaero
Sphaerodactylus thompsoni  - Thompson's least gecko, Barahona limestone sphaero
Sphaerodactylus torrei  - Barbour's least gecko, Cuban broad-banded geckolet
Sphaerodactylus townsendi  - Townsend's least gecko, Townsend's dwarf sphaero, Puerto Rican sandy geckolet 
Sphaerodactylus underwoodi  - Underwood's least gecko, Turks Islands geckolet
Sphaerodactylus verdeluzicola  - Puerto Rican karst gecko  
Sphaerodactylus vincenti  - Vincent's least gecko, Central Lesser Antillean sphaero, Windward geckolet 
Sphaerodactylus williamsi  - Williams's least gecko, Haitian striped geckolet
Sphaerodactylus zygaena  - Dame-Marie least gecko, Tiburon coastal geckolet

Nota bene: A binomial authority in parentheses indicates that the species was originally described in a genus other than Sphaerodactylus.

References

Further reading
 Schwartz A, Thomas R (1975). A Check-list of West Indian Amphibians and Reptiles. Carnegie Museum of Natural History Special Publication No. 1. Pittsburgh, Pennsylvania: Carnegie Museum of Natural History. 216 pp. (Sphaerodactylus, pp. 142–164).
Wagler J (1830). Natürliches System der AMPHIBIEN, mit vorangehender Classification der SÄUGTHIERE und VÖGEL. Ein Beitrag zur vergleichenden Zoologie. Munich, Stuttgart and Tübingen: J.G. Cotta. vi + 354 pp. + one plate. (Sphaerodactylus, new genus, p. 143). (in German and Latin).

External links

 
Lizard genera
Lizards of North America
Lizards of South America
Taxa named by Johann Georg Wagler